Dum Dum Cantonment railway station is a Kolkata Suburban Railway station in Dum Dum. Its code is DDC. The Dum Dum Cantonment metro station is adjacent to Dum Dum Cantonment railway station. It serves Dum Dum Cantonment and the surrounding areas. The station consists of three platforms. The platform is very much well sheltered with newly installed seating arrangements and fans.

Dum Dum Cantonment is located on Sealdah–Hasnabad–Bangaon–Ranaghat line of Kolkata Suburban Railway. Link between Dum Dum to Khulna now in Bangladesh, via Bangaon was constructed by Bengal Central Railway Company in 1882–84. It was named by the cantonment area near Dum Dum. The Sealdah–Dum Dum–Barasat–Ashok Nagar–Bangaon sector was electrified in 1963–64.

See also

References

External links
 Dum Dum Cantonment railway station map
 

Sealdah railway division
Railway stations in North 24 Parganas district
Transport in Kolkata
1883 establishments in India
Kolkata Suburban Railway stations